Recto is the "right" or "front" side and verso is the "left" or "back" side when text is written or printed on a leaf of paper in a bound item such as a codex, book, broadsheet, or pamphlet.

Etymology

Usage

This terminology has been standard since the beginnings of modern codicology in the 17th century.

In 2011, Martyn Lyons argued that the term  "right, correct, proper" for the front side of the leaf derives from the use of papyrus in late antiquity, as a different grain ran across each side, and only one side was suitable to be written on, so that usually papyrus would carry writing only on the "correct", smooth side (and just in exceptional cases would there be writing on the reverse side of the leaf).

The terms "recto" and "verso" are also used in the codicology of manuscripts written in right-to-left scripts, like Syriac, Arabic and Hebrew. However, as these scripts are written in the other direction to the scripts witnessed in European codices, the recto page is to the left while the verso is to the right. The reading order of each folio remains first verso, then recto, regardless of writing direction.

The terms are carried over into printing;  is the norm for printed books but was an important advantage of the printing press over the much older Asian woodblock printing method, which printed by rubbing from behind the page being printed, and so could only print on one side of a piece of paper. The distinction between recto and verso can be convenient in the annotation of scholarly books, particularly in bilingual edition translations.

The "recto" and "verso" terms can also be employed for the front and back of a one-sheet artwork, particularly in drawing.  A  drawing is a sheet with drawings on both sides, for example in a sketchbook—although usually in these cases there is no obvious primary side.  Some works are planned to exploit being on two sides of the same piece of paper, but usually the works are not intended to be considered together.  Paper was relatively expensive in the past; good drawing paper still is much more expensive than normal paper.

By book publishing convention, the first page of a book, and sometimes of each section and chapter of a book, is a recto page, and hence all recto pages will have odd numbers and all verso pages will have even numbers.

In many early printed books or incunables and still in some 16th-century books (e.g. Thus, each  carries a consecutive number on its recto side, while on the verso side there is no number. This was also very common in e.g. internal company reports in the 20th century, before double-sided printers became commonplace in offices.

See also
 Book design
 Obverse and reverse in coins
 Page spread
 Page (paper)

References

External links 

Printing
Book design
Book terminology
Papyrus
Codicology